Austin Jones (born January 19, 1996) is an American off-road racing driver. He won the Dakar Rally in 2022 in the SSV T4 category. He also won the 2021 FIA World Cup for Cross-Country Rallies in the SSV T4 category and is a 2x Baja 1000 winner and SCORE International Champion in the Trophy Truck Spec Class.

Trophy Truck 
Jones started his career in racing early, first taking the co-driver seat as his father Jesse's navigator in 2018 as the age of 22. It wasn’t long until a young Jones moved into the driver’s seat, making a name for himself almost immediately in the desert racing scene. Behind the wheel of a TSCO built and prepped Thunderstruck 6100 truck, Jones began taking on – and winning – some of North America’s most infamous desert races, including the San Felipe 250, Baja 500 and Baja 1000 and eventually securing a SCORE championship as well as SCORE’s 2019 Rookie of the Year.

Rally-Raid 
In 2019, Jones shifted his focus to the challenge of European-style off-road rallies and taking on some of the toughest rally-raid races in the world. Moving from trophy trucks into side-by-side (vehicles) (SSV), Jones would find himself up against some of the best and most prominent names in international racing. Jones quickly proved he was up to the challenge, eventually teaming up with Brazilian co-driver Gustavo Gugelmin, a seasoned navigator with proven track record in SSV racing.

In 2021, the duo found themselves traveling the world to compete in the FIA World Cup of Cross-Country Rally season. After placing first in three of the four points-sanctioned rallies, Jones became the first American to be named the FIA World Cup of Cross-Country Rallies Champion. 

He would continue with that momentum, claiming first-place overall at the race that many agree is the world’s toughest and most iconic off-road rally race in the world – Dakar – at the start of 2022. In what Jones would agree would be one of his hardest fought battles in his racing career, the win almost slipped through his fingers after a broken differential would cost the pair almost 18 minutes, cutting into their lead and putting them 01’41’’ behind the first place position. Jones would strip the SSV and push hard during the race’s final stage, claiming victory with one of the narrowest margins of the rally, winning by only 02’37’’. While Jones did not win a stage during the rally, as the General Ranking leader for 8 of the 13 stages, he proved his ability to drive smart and strategically was what it takes to win a 13-day race as treacherous and grueling as Dakar.

It was initially reported that Gerard Farres who was starting the final day of the rally in 1st position with a comfortable lead suffered electrical problems in the final stage resulting in a win for Jones. However, it was later revealed that Farres had been told that he needed to slow down in the final stage to allow Jones to win the event. Fares was quoted saying “When we saw we were leading the Dakar on the second last day of the race, we realized we would have a problem.”

Sponsors 
Jones drives for the Red Bull Off-Road Junior Team USA By BFGoodrich.

Racing record

Dakar Rally

Complete World Rally-Raid Championship results
(key)

* Season still in progress

References

1996 births
Living people
American rally drivers
Off-road racing drivers
Dakar Rally drivers
Dakar Rally winning drivers